Kang Ye-won (born Kim Ji-eun; March 15, 1979) is a South Korean actress best known for her roles in Tidal Wave, Harmony and Quick.

Filmography

Film

Television series

Variety show

Musicals

Awards and nominations

Personal life and health 
She was a classically trained opera singer, and graduated from Hanyang University with Bachelor of Music with vocal major. However, she lost confidence to sing after suffering from vocal nodules.

She is a devout Christian and it was also revealed on Unnie's Slam Dunk that she is also a painter. She had hosted exhibitions since 2015.

In October 2021, she contracted COVID-19 despite being fully vaccinated.

References

External links

 
 
 

South Korean film actresses
South Korean television actresses
South Korean female idols
Living people
1979 births
People from Daegu
21st-century South Korean actresses